Guanazodine is a hypotensive sympatholytic drug.

References

Adrenergic release inhibitors
Azocanes
Guanidines